The  Jacksonville Sharks season was the inaugural season for the franchise in the Arena Football League. The team was coached by Les Moss and played their home games at Jacksonville Veterans Memorial Arena. The Sharks put together a 12–4 record, winning the South division and was also the top team in the American Conference. However, the Sharks lost a back-and-forth game at home to the Orlando Predators in the opening playoff round by a score of 69–73.

Standings

Regular season schedule
The first game in franchise history for the Sharks was on April 3 as they visited the Yard Dawgz. Their first home game for the franchise is on April 16 during Week 3 against the Predators. The conclusion of the regular season was at home in Week 18 against the Shock on July 30.

All times are EDT

Playoff schedule

All times are EDT

Regular season

Week 1: at Oklahoma City Yard Dawgz

The first game in franchise history for the Sharks was a low-scoring affair in the 1st half, with the Sharks holding a slight lead at 13–10 at halftime. The Sharks pulled away in the 3rd quarter with three touchdown passes. Their lead fell to only 10 points with just over 4 minutes to play, but the Sharks' special teams returned an onside kick for a touchdown to seal their first-ever win. The Sharks only put up 225 yards of total offense, while quarterback Aaron Garcia, who had most recently played for the New York Dragons in 2008, completed 11 passes on 16 attempts for 154 yards, but 5 of those passes were touchdowns.

Week 2: at Alabama Vipers

The Sharks led by a touchdown at halftime, but gave up 42 points to the Vipers in the 2nd half, losing the game 63–49. After scoring the 2nd half's first touchdown, the Sharks went nearly 20 minutes without another touchdown, allowing the Vipers to take a 21-point lead in the meantime. It was a deficit too great for the Sharks to overcome, despite scoring a touchdown on their last two drives of the game. Quarterback Aaron Garcia threw for 186 yards, with 5 touchdowns, but 2 interceptions. The Sharks had only 190 net yards in the game.

Week 3: vs. Orlando Predators

The Sharks took on one of their in-state opponents for the first time ever in what was called the "Jive on 95," similar to the name of the Predators' in-state rivalry with the Tampa Bay Storm, The War on I-4. The Sharks never trailed in the game, holding a 24–7 lead at halftime. After a Predators field goal in the 3rd quarter, Jacksonville scored 27 of the next 34 points of the game. Aaron Garcia completed 21 of 29 passes for 206 yards and 6 touchdowns. With the win, the Sharks improved to 2–1.

Week 4: BYE

Week 5: vs. Tulsa Talons

Neither team made a defensive stop in the 1st half, but the Sharks led 28–26 at the break thanks to a pair of missed extra points by the Talons. The scoring exploded in the 4th quarter, as the teams combined for 47 points. With 56 seconds left in the final quarter, the Talons used up all but 8 seconds left to pull ahead with a 4-yard touchdown pass, making the score 60–56 in favor of Tulsa. After receiving the ensuing kickoff, the Sharks had time for one more play. Aaron Garcia's pass to the end zone was nearly caught for a touchdown, but fell incomplete. This should have ended the game, however a defensive pass interference penalty was called on the Talons, meaning the Sharks would be given another shot on an untimed down. Jacksonville capitalized on the second chance with a 9-yard pass from Garcia caught by Dallas Baker for a touchdown, giving the Sharks their third win of the season.

Garcia completed 24 of 33 passes for 294 yards, 7 touchdowns, and 2 interceptions. Baker finished with 105 receiving yards on 8 catches, with 4 touchdowns. Jomo Wilson caught for 106 yards on the night, with just a single touchdown.

Week 6: at Tampa Bay Storm

In a game that saw neither team lead by more than 6 points, the Sharks came out on top by a final score of 46–43. Tampa Bay took a 43–38 lead with just over a minute to play in the 4th quarter. Jacksonville answered with a touchdown drive that ended with a 3-yard touchdown reception by Sale' Key. The Storm's hopes of a last-second score vanished after a fumble on their ensuing drive that was picked up by the Sharks' Micheaux Robinson. Jacksonville then ran out the clock to seal their fourth win. Aaron Garcia threw for 342 yards and 5 touchdowns with 2 interceptions. Jomo Wilson led all receivers with 148 yards on 10 catches for 3 touchdowns, and also ran for a touchdown in the game.

Week 7: vs. Dallas Vigilantes

The Sharks had control of the game in the 1st half with a 36–7 lead late in the 2nd quarter, although Dallas scored another touchdown to make it 36–14 at the half. The Vigilantes scored the first two touchdowns of the 3rd quarter, and by the end of the 3rd quarter, Jacksonville's lead shrunk to just 43–35. Turnovers had been a problem for Dallas all night, and lost their third fumble of the game in the 4th quarter. The loose ball was scooped up by Jacksonville's Justin Parrish and returned for a touchdown to give the Sharks a 63–41 lead. The 21-point lead would turn into the margin of victory as the Sharks took the game by a 70–49 score.

Aaron Garcia threw for 318 yards and 8 touchdowns. Jomo Wilson caught 4 touchdowns in the game, and had with 123 yards, was the team's leading receiver.

Week 8: vs. Cleveland Gladiators

Week 9: at Spokane Shock

Week 10: at Chicago Rush

Week 11: BYE

Week 12: at Orlando Predators

Week 13: vs. Arizona Rattlers

Week 14: vs. Alabama Vipers

Week 15: at Utah Blaze

By defeating the Blaze, the Sharks clinched a playoff berth.

Week 16: vs. Tampa Bay Storm

Week 17: at Bossier–Shreveport Battle Wings

Week 18: vs. Spokane Shock

With the win over the Shock, the Sharks clinched the American Conference's best record.

Playoffs

American Conference Semifinals: vs. Orlando Predators

References

Jacksonville Sharks
Jacksonville Sharks seasons
Jack